Urban plague is an infectious disease among rodent species that live in close association with humans in urban areas. It is caused by the bacterium Yersinia pestis which is the same bacterium that causes bubonic and pneumonic plague in humans. Plague was first introduced into the United States in 1900 by rat–infested steamships that had sailed from affected areas, mostly from Asia. Urban plague spread from urban rats to rural rodent species, especially among prairie dogs in the western United States.

Vector reservoir 
Common vectors for urban plague are house mice, black rats, and Norway rats.

Transmission 

Urban plague can be spread from animals to humans via flea bites and handling of infected fluids and tissues. Human to human infection occurs from droplets that contain plague bacteria which are produced when an infected person coughs.

See also 
Sylvatic plague
Epizootic

References

External links
 
 Black Death at BBC

Plague (disease)
Rodent-carried diseases